Park Road 33 (PR 33) is a park road in north central Texas that runs from Caddo to Possum Kingdom State Park.

Route description
PR 33 begins south of the unincorporated community of Caddo in Stephens County, at a junction with  US 180 and  FM 717. The route travels to the north through Caddo before turning eastward after its intersection with  FM 3253. The highway turns to the northeast before entering Palo Pinto County and Possum Kingdom State Park. Within the park, the route curves to the north and then to the northwest; a spur route, signed as PR 33A, branches off to the northeast and provides access to boat launching and camping areas. The PR 33 designation ends within the park, near the Park Store and Marina.

History
PR 33 was first designated along its current route in 1944. While TxDOT does not indicate the actual date of construction, the road was most likely complete by 1950, when the park itself was opened to the public. The spur extension within the park was designated in 1960.

Major intersections

See also

References

External links

0033
Transportation in Palo Pinto County, Texas
Transportation in Stephens County, Texas
Civilian Conservation Corps in Texas